General Randall may refer to:

Carey A. Randall (1912–2008), U.S. Marine Corps major general
George Morton Randall (1841–1918), U.S. Army major general

See also
Horace Randal (1833–1864), Confederate States Army brigadier general by appointment
Alanson Merwin Randol (1837–1887), Union Army brevet brigadier general of volunteers